Picumnus is a large genus of piculets. With a total length of 8–10 cm (3–4 in), they are among the smallest birds in the woodpecker family.

Species limits in this genus are doubtful, and the rate of interbreeding is "inordinately high" (Remsen et al. 2007).  As defined by Winkler and Christie (2002), it contains the 27 species listed below, all from the Neotropics except the speckled piculet, which is Asian (and sometimes placed in a monotypic genus, Vivia).

Their upperparts are brownish, greyish or olive, in some species with darker barring or white or yellowish spotting on the mantle. The underparts vary greatly among the species, ranging from all rich brown in the chestnut piculet, to whitish in the plain-breasted piculet, white with dark bars in the white-barred piculet, and pale yellowish with dark bars on the chest and dark spots and streaks  on the belly in the bar-breasted piculet. They have black crowns with red, orange, or yellow marks in the male and white dots in the female, except that the male speckled piculet has brown crown marks and the female lacks white dots. Most have rather short black tails with white stripes down the edges and the center (Blume and Winkler 2003). In two species, the rufous-breasted and the chestnut piculets, the white is largely replaced by rufous.

While the individual species often are habitat specialists (as evident by a number of highly restricted species such as the rusty-necked and ochraceous piculets), members of this genus range from dry Caatinga woodland to humid Amazonian and Atlantic Forest. They are generally found in pairs or small groups. The Neotropical species fall into two broad song groups, with the first having a song consisting of a long trill, and the second a song consisting of series of two or more descending notes.

Species
 Speckled piculet,  Picumnus innominatus (or Vivia innominata)
 Bar-breasted piculet,  Picumnus aurifrons
 Orinoco piculet,  Picumnus pumilus
 Lafresnaye's piculet,  Picumnus lafresnayi
 Golden-spangled piculet,  Picumnus exilis
 Black-dotted piculet,  Picumnus nigropunctatus
 Ecuadorian piculet,  Picumnus sclateri
 Scaled piculet,  Picumnus squamulatus
 White-bellied piculet,  Picumnus spilogaster
 Arrowhead piculet,  Picumnus minutissimus
 Spotted piculet,  Picumnus pygmaeus
 Speckle-chested piculet,  Picumnus steindachneri
 Varzea piculet,  Picumnus varzeae
 White-barred piculet,  Picumnus cirratus
 Ocellated piculet,  Picumnus dorbignyanus
 Ochre-collared piculet,  Picumnus temminckii
 White-wedged piculet,  Picumnus albosquamatus
 Rusty-necked piculet,  Picumnus fuscus
 Rufous-breasted piculet,  Picumnus rufiventris
 Ochraceous piculet,  Picumnus limae
 Mottled piculet,  Picumnus nebulosus
 Plain-breasted piculet,  Picumnus castelnau
 Fine-barred piculet,  Picumnus subtilis
 Olivaceous piculet,  Picumnus olivaceus
 Greyish piculet,  Picumnus granadensis
 Chestnut piculet,  Picumnus cinnamomeus
 Picumnus sp. nov.? "Serra Geral do Tocantins"

See also
 Genus Sasia

References
 
 
 Peterson, Alan P. (Editor). 1999. Zoological Nomenclature Resource (Zoonomen). Accessed 2007-09-08.
Remsen, J. V., Jr., C. D. Cadena, A. Jaramillo, M. Nores, J. F. Pacheco, M. B. Robbins, T. S. Schulenberg, F. G. Stiles, D. F. Stotz, and K. J. Zimmer. [Version 2007-10-07.] A classification of the bird species of South America. American Ornithologists' Union. Accessed 2007-10-07.

 
Bird genera
Picidae